Dunmall's snake (Furina dunmalli) is a species of venomous snake in the family Elapidae. The species is endemic to Australia.

Etymology
The specific name, dunmalli, is in honor of William "Bill" Dunmall, who collected the type specimen.

Geographic range
F. dunmalli has a patchy distribution in southeastern Queensland and the border area with New South Wales from Yelarbon; Texas, Queensland; and Ashford. Westerly distribution is in the Carnarvon National Park, and north to Rockhampton on the coast, and Clermont west of the Great Dividing Range.

Habitat

Behavior
F. dunmalli is terrestrial and nocturnal.

Diet
F. dunmalli preys upon small lizards.

Reproduction
F. dunmalli is oviparous.

References

Further reading
Cogger HG (2014). Reptiles and Amphibians of Australia, Seventh Edition. Clayton, Victoria, Australia: CSIRO Publishing. xxx + 1,033 pp. .
Wilson S, Swan G (2013). A Complete Guide to Reptiles of Australia, Fourth Edition. Sydney: New Holland Publishers. 522 pp. .
Worrell E (1955). "A New Elapine Snake from Queensland". Proceedings of the Royal Zoological Society of New South Wales 1953-54: 41–43. (Glyphodon dunmalli, new species).

Snakes of Australia
Furina
Vulnerable fauna of Australia
Reptiles described in 1955
Taxonomy articles created by Polbot